The section Adenosepalum of genus Hypericum contains thirty species and two hybrids, as well as five recognized subspecies, in four subsections. The section was described by French botanist Édouard Spach and its type species is Hypericum montanum. Species in Adenosepalum are found in Europe, Russia, the Caucasus, and Morocco. They are shrubs, shrublets, and herbs that grow to be 2.5 meters in height with glabrous or simple hairs, black glands on their leaves, which are placed opposite or are 3-whorled.

Species

References 

Hypericum sections
Hypericum sect. Adenosepalum